Moussa Njie (born 2 October 1995) is a Norwegian football midfielder who plays for Sandefjord. He is the older brother of Bilal Njie.

Njie played youth football for his childhood club Holmlia SK. He made his Eliteserien debut for Vålerenga Fotball in November 2013 against Aalesund. In the summer of 2015 he joined Bærum. On 2 December 2015 he signed for Stabæk. On 17 January 2019 he signed for Partizan.

Career statistics

Club

Honours

Club

Partizan
 Serbian Cup: 2019

References

1995 births
Living people
Footballers from Oslo
Norwegian people of Gambian descent
Norwegian footballers
Norwegian expatriate footballers
Vålerenga Fotball players
Bærum SK players
Stabæk Fotball players
FK Partizan players
Odds BK players
Eliteserien players
Norwegian First Division players
Norwegian Second Division players
Serbian SuperLiga players
Norwegian expatriate sportspeople in Serbia
Expatriate footballers in Serbia
Association football midfielders